The Irish Jewish Museum is a small museum located in the once highly Jewish populated area of Portobello, around the South Circular Road, Dublin 8, dedicated to the history of the Irish Jewish community.

The museum was opened in June 1985 by Chaim Herzog who was then president of Israel and was born in Ireland. The museum is in a former Synagogue built in 1917 in two adjoining terraced houses on Walworth Road, off the South Circular Road. The surrounding area, known as Portobello, was previously a Jewish area, however the large scale emigration that affected Ireland in the 1950s had a particularly strong effect on the Jewish population; during this period there was a migration to the suburbs and Dublin's main synagogue shifted to Terenure. The synagogue is preserved, there are artifacts on display, and the museum houses genealogical records.

Contents and displays

The museum contains a substantial collection of memorabilia relating to the Irish Jewish communities and their various associations and contributions to present day Ireland. The material relates to the last 150 years and is associated with the communities of Belfast, Cork, Derry, Drogheda, Dublin, Limerick and Waterford.

The museum is divided into several distinct areas. In the entrance area and corridors there is a display of photographs, paintings, certificates and testimonials. The ground floor contains a general display relating to the commercial and social life of the Jewish community. A special feature adjoining the area is the kitchen depicting a typical Sabbath/Festival meal setting in a Jewish home in the late 19th/early 20th century in the neighbourhood.

Upstairs, the original Synagogue, with all its ritual fittings, is on view and also the Harold Smerling gallery containing Jewish religious objects.

2005 attacks
In 2005, the museum was sprayed several times with anti-Semitic slogans. Minister for Foreign Affairs Dermot Ahern visited the museum to express Government support for the museum and the Jewish community. Ahern's actions were praised by Israeli Foreign Minister Silvan Shalom. The culprit was identified from CCTV images and arrested. At trial, his lawyers stated that the attacks were a result of his ongoing schizophrenia and he was sentenced to six months of probation. Raphael Siev, curator of the museum, said the attacks had caused "great terror" and "great upset" but the trial judge prevented him from continuing, citing the uncertain legal status of victim impact statements in cases of this sort.

Proposed development
In 2012, the museum began a fundraising campaign to expand and develop the site, under the auspices of the Office of Public Works. In December 2013, An Bord Pleanála voted 5 to 3 in favour of the plan, granting planning permission with a number of conditions. The plans include demolition of the original synagogue at numbers 3 and 4 Walworth Road, as well as the demolition of 3 houses at numbers 5 to 7 Walworth Road, a 6-metre basement excavation, and construction of a facsimile 19th century facade. Taoiseach Enda Kenny supported the plan, describing it as an "exciting project... for the regeneration of the city”. The plans were criticised by some local residents, councillors, and architects. 25 formal objections were submitted, citing facadism, destruction of the original synagogue, and lack of public engagement as the main reasons for opposition.

See also
History of the Jews in Ireland

References

External links

An article about the proposed expansion of the Irish Jewish Museum, from 2013, with photographs
The Irish Jewish Museum on visitdublin.com, the official tourist website
News item about Dermot Ahern's visit

Jewish museums
Jews and Judaism in Dublin (city)
Museums established in 1985
Museums in Dublin (city)
Synagogues in the Republic of Ireland
Synagogues preserved as museums
1985 establishments in Ireland
20th-century religious buildings and structures in the Republic of Ireland
Religious museums in Ireland